Silberberg is a mountain of Bavarian Forest, Bavaria, Germany.

Gallery

cable car, toboggan run, ski run

Summit area of Silberberg

Minerals and ores from the Silberberg
Some of the 60 minerals of the Silberberg, in the museum room of the visitors' mine

External links

Websites in German language
Historical mine 
Geological information from the Bavarian State Office for environment

Mountains of Bavaria
Show mines
Mountains of the Bavarian Forest